The traditional counting system used in the Welsh language is vigesimal, i.e. based on twenties where numbers from 11–14 are "x on ten", 16–19 are "x on fifteen" (though 18 is more usually "two nines"); numbers from 21–39 are "1–19 on twenty", 40 is "two twenty", 60 is "three twenty", etc.

Numerals

Variation in form
There is some syntactically and phonologically triggered variation in the form of numerals. There are, for example, masculine and feminine forms of the numbers "two" ( and ), "three" ( and ) and "four" ( and ), which must agree with the grammatical gender of the objects being counted. The numerals for "five", "six" and "hundred" (and ) also have reduced forms when they precede the object they are counting. Numerals change as expected according to normal rules of consonant mutation; some also trigger mutation in some following words (see below for details).

Use of the decimal system
The decimal system is widely used, but is rather uncommon for dates and ages. Larger numbers, however, tend to be expressed in this system e.g. 1,965 . In referring to years, on the other hand, the number of thousands is stated, followed by the individual digits, e.g. 1965 .

The Welsh decimal counting system was devised by 19th-century Patagonian Welsh businessmen in Argentina for accountancy purposes. It was recommended to teachers for use in the first Welsh language schools in Patagonia by Richard Jones Berwyn in a book published in 1878. The system was later adopted in Wales in the late 1940s with the beginning of Welsh-medium education.

Use with nouns

The singular form of the noun is used with numbers, but for larger numbers an alternative form is permitted, where  ("of") with the plural noun follows the number.  Except where using this plural form, the noun is placed directly after the number but before any parts of the number that are added using  ("on") in the traditional system.

Nouns are also mutated following many numbers.   triggers the soft mutation of feminine nouns, other than those beginning with "ll" and "rh", but not masculine nouns.   and  both trigger the soft mutation (ll and rh included). (but not ) and  trigger the aspirate mutation. The part of the number immediately preceding the noun will determine any mutation of the noun.

The following example illustrates several of these points:

Notes

Welsh language
Numerals